Mexicans are the citizens and nationals of the United Mexican States, coloquially referred to as Mexico.

The most spoken language by Mexicans is Spanish, but some may also speak languages from 68 different Indigenous linguistic groups and other languages brought to Mexico by recent immigration or learned by Mexican expats residing in other countries. In 2015, 21.5% of Mexico's population self-identified as being Indigenous. There are about 12 million Mexican nationals residing outside Mexico, with about 11.7 million living in the United States. The larger Mexican diaspora can also include individuals that trace ancestry to Mexico and self-identify as Mexican yet are not necessarily Mexican by citizenship, culture or language. The United States has the largest Mexican population after Mexico in the world at 37,186,361 (2019).

The modern nation of Mexico achieved independence from the Spanish Empire in 1821, after a decade long war for independence starting in 1810; this began the process of forging a national identity that fused the cultural traits of Indigenous pre-Columbian origin with those of Spanish ancestry. This led to what has been termed "a peculiar form of multi-ethnic nationalism".

History

The Mexican people have varied origins and an identity that has evolved with the succession of conquests among Amerindian groups and later by Europeans. The area that is now modern-day Mexico has cradled many predecessor civilizations, going back as far as the Olmec which influenced the latter civilizations of Teotihuacan (200 BC to 700 AD) and the much debated Toltec people who flourished around the 10th and 12th centuries AD, and ending with the last great indigenous civilization before the Spanish Conquest, the Aztecs (13 March 1325 to 13 August 1521). The Nahuatl language was a common tongue in the region of modern Central Mexico during the Aztec Empire, but after the arrival of Europeans the common language of the region became Spanish.

After the conquest of the Aztec empire, the Spanish re-administered the land and expanded their own empire beyond the former boundaries of the Aztec, adding more territory to the Mexican sphere of influence which remained under the Spanish Crown for 300 years. The Spaniards enslaved millions of Africans in South America. Slavery in Mexico did not end until 1888. Cultural diffusion and intermixing among the Amerindian populations with African and the Europeans created the modern Mexican identity which is a mixture of regional indigenous, European, and African cultures that evolved into a national culture during the Spanish period. This new identity was defined as "Mexican" shortly after the Mexican War of Independence and was more invigorated and developed after the Mexican Revolution when the Constitution of 1917 officially established Mexico as an indivisible pluricultural nation founded on its indigenous roots.

Definitions

Mexicano (Mexican) is derived from the word Mexico itself. In the principal model to create demonyms in Spanish, the suffix -ano is added to the name of the place of origin. However, in Nahuatl language, the original demonym becomes Mexica.

It has been suggested that the name of the country is derived from Mextli or Mēxihtli, a secret name for the god of war and patron of the Mexicas, Huitzilopochtli, in which case Mēxihco means "Place where Huitzilopochtli lives". Another hypothesis suggests that Mēxihco derives from the Nahuatl words for "Moon" (Mētztli) and navel (xīctli). This meaning ("Place at the Center of the Moon") might then refer to Tenochtitlan's position in the middle of Lake Texcoco. The system of interconnected lakes, of which Texcoco formed the center, had the form of a rabbit, which the Mesoamericans pareidolically associated with the Moon. Still another hypothesis suggests that it is derived from Mēctli, the goddess of maguey.

Ethnic groups

Mestizo Mexicans

The majority of Mexicans have varying degrees of Spanish and Native Mesoamerican ancestry and have been classified as "Mestizos". In the modern meaning of the term this means that they identify fully neither with any indigenous culture nor with a Spanish cultural heritage, but rather identify with the uniquely Mexican identity which incorporates elements from both Spanish and indigenous traditions. By the deliberate efforts of post-revolutionary governments the "Mestizo identity" was constructed as the base of the modern Mexican national identity, through a process of cultural synthesis referred to as mestizaje . Mexican politicians and reformers such as José Vasconcelos and Manuel Gamio were instrumental in building a Mexican national identity on the concept of mestizaje.

Since the Mestizo identity promoted by the government is more of a cultural self-identity, it has achieved a strong influence in the country, with many people who may be considered "White" identifying with it. This has caused many people who may not qualify as "Mestizos" in its original sense to be counted as such in Mexico's demographic investigations and censuses. 

A similar situation occurs regarding the distinctions between Indigenous peoples and Mestizos: while the term Mestizo is sometimes used in English with the meaning of a person with mixed indigenous and European blood, this usage does not conform to the Mexican social reality where a person of pure Indigenous genetic heritage would be considered Mestizo either by rejecting his indigenous culture or by not speaking an indigenous language, and a person with none or a very low percentage of indigenous genetic heritage would be considered fully indigenous either by speaking an indigenous language or by identifying with a particular indigenous cultural heritage.

In the Yucatán peninsula the word Mestizo has a different meaning, with it being to refer to the Maya-speaking populations living in traditional communities, because during the caste war of the late 19th century those Maya who did not join the rebellion were classified as Mestizos. In Chiapas the word "Ladino" is used instead of mestizo.

Cultural policies in early post-revolutionary Mexico were paternalistic towards the indigenous people, with efforts designed to "help" indigenous peoples achieve the same level of progress as the rest of society, eventually assimilating indigenous peoples completely to Mestizo Mexican culture, working toward the goal of eventually solving the "Amerindian problem" by transforming indigenous communities into Mestizo communities.

Given that the word Mestizo has different implications in certain areas in Mexico, estimates of the Mexican Mestizo population vary widely. According to the Encyclopædia Britannica, which uses a biology-based approach, between one half and two thirds of the Mexican population is Mestizo. A culture-based estimate gives the percentage of Mestizos as high as 90%. Paradoxically, the word Mestizo has long been dropped from popular Mexican vocabulary, with the word even having pejorative connotations further complicating attempts to quantify Mestizos via self-identification.  Recent research based on self-identification indeed, observing that many Mexicans do not actually identify as mestizos and would not agree to be labeled as such, with "static" racial labels such as White, Indian, Black etc. being more commonly used.

While for most of its history the concept of Mestizo and Mestizaje has been lauded by Mexico's intellectual circles, in recent times the concept has been target of criticism, with its detractors claiming that it delegitimizes the importance of race in Mexico under the idea of "(racism) not existing here (in Mexico), as everybody is Mestizo." In general, the authors conclude that Mexico introducing a real racial classification and accepting itself as a multicultural country opposed to a monolithic Mestizo country would bring benefits to the Mexican society as a whole.

White Mexicans

White Mexicans are Mexican citizens who trace all or most of their ancestry to Europe. Europeans began arriving in Mexico during the Spanish conquest of the Aztec Empire; and while during the colonial period most European immigration was Spanish, in the 19th and 20th centuries European and European-derived populations from North and South America did immigrate to the country. According to 20th- and 21st-century academics, large scale intermixing between the European immigrants and the native indigenous peoples would produce a Mestizo group which would become the overwhelming majority of Mexico's population by the time of Independence. However, according to church registers from the colonial times, the majority of Spanish men married with Spanish women. Said registers also put in question other narratives held by contemporary academics, such as European immigrants who arrived to Mexico being almost exclusively men or that "pure Spanish" people were all part of a small powerful elite, as Spaniards were often the most numerous ethnic group in the colonial cities and there were menial workers and people in poverty who were of complete Spanish origin.

Estimates of Mexico's white population differ greatly in both, methodology and percentages given, extra-official sources such as the World Factbook and Encyclopædia Britannica, which use the 1921 census results as the base of their estimations calculate Mexico's white population as only 9% or between one tenth to one fifth (the results of the 1921 census, however, have been contested by various historians and deemed inaccurate). Surveys that account for phenotypical traits and have performed actual field research suggest rather higher percentages: using the presence of blond hair as reference to classify a Mexican as white, the Metropolitan Autonomous University of Mexico calculated the percentage of said ethnic group at 23%. With a similar methodology, the American Sociological Association obtained a percentage of 18.8% having its higher frequency on the North region (22.3%–23.9%) followed by the Center region (18.4%–21.3%) and the South region (11.9%). Another study made by the University College London in collaboration with Mexico's National Institute of Anthropology and History found that the frequencies of blond hair and light eyes in Mexicans are of 18% and 28% respectively, surveys that use as reference skin color such as those made by Mexico's National Council to Prevent Discrimination and Mexico's National Institute of Statistics and Geography reported a percentages of 47% in 2010 and 49% in 2017 respectively. Another survey published in 2018 reported a percentage significativelly lower at 29%, this time however, the surveying of Mexicans from "vulnerable groups" was prioritized, which among other measures meant that states known to have high numbers of people from said groups surveyed more people.

Mexico's northern and western regions have the highest percentages of European population, with the majority of the people not having native admixture or being of predominantly European ancestry, resembling in aspect that of northern Spaniards. In the north and west of Mexico, the indigenous tribes were substantially smaller than those found in central and southern Mexico, and also much less organized, thus they remained isolated from the rest of the population or even in some cases were hostile towards Mexican colonists. The northeast region, in which the indigenous population was eliminated by early European settlers, became the region with the highest proportion of whites during the Spanish colonial period. However, recent immigrants from southern Mexico have been changing, to some degree, its demographic trends.

Indigenous Mexicans

The 2003 General Law of Linguistic Rights of the Indigenous Peoples recognizes 62 indigenous languages as "national languages" which have the same validity as Spanish in all territories in which they are spoken. The recognition of indigenous languages and the protection of indigenous cultures is granted not only to the ethnic groups indigenous to modern-day Mexican territory, but also to other North American indigenous groups that migrated to Mexico from the United States in the 19th century and those who immigrated from Guatemala in the 1980s.

The category of "indigena" (indigenous) in Mexico has been defined based on different criteria through history, this means that the percentage of the Mexican population defined as "indigenous" varies according to the definition applied. It can be defined narrowly according to linguistic criteria including only persons that speak an indigenous language, based on this criterion approximately 5.4% of the population is Indigenous. Nonetheless, activists for the rights of indigenous peoples have referred to the usage of this criterion for census purposes as "statistical genocide".

Other surveys made by the Mexican government do count as Indigenous all persons who speak an indigenous language and people who do not speak indigenous languages nor live in indigenous communities but self-identifies as Indigenous. According to this criterion, the National Commission for the Development of Indigenous Peoples (Comisión Nacional para el Desarrollo de los Pueblos Indígenas, or CDI in Spanish) and the INEGI (Mexico's National Institute of Statistics and Geography), state that there are 15.7 million indigenous people in Mexico of many different ethnic groups, which constitute 14.9% of the population in the country.

According to the latest intercensal survey carried out by the Mexican government in 2015, Indigenous people make up 21.5% of Mexico's population. In this occasion, people who self-identified as "Indigenous" and people who self-identified as "partially Indigenous" were classified in the "Indigenous" category altogether.

The absolute indigenous population is growing, but at a slower rate than the rest of the population so that the percentage of indigenous peoples is nonetheless falling. The majority of the indigenous population is concentrated in the central-southern and south-eastern states, with the majority of the indigenous population living in rural areas. Some indigenous communities have a degree of autonomy under the legislation of "usos y costumbres", which allows them to regulate some internal issues under customary law.

According to the CDI, the states with the greatest percentage of indigenous population are Yucatán, with 62.7%, Quintana Roo with 33.8% and Campeche with 32% of the population being indigenous, most of them Maya; Oaxaca with 58% of the population, the most numerous groups being the Mixtec and Zapotec peoples; Chiapas has 32.7%, the majority being Tzeltal and Tzotzil Maya; Hidalgo with 30.1%, the majority being Otomi; Puebla with 25.2%, and Guerrero with 22.6%, mostly Nahua people and the states of San Luis Potosí and Veracruz both home to a population of 19% indigenous people, mostly from the Totonac, Nahua and Teenek (Huastec) groups.

Other ethno-cultural communities

Jewish Mexicans

A Jewish, specifically Sephardic, population has existed in Mexico since the conquest. The current Jewish population in Mexico mostly consists of those who have descended from immigrants from the 19th and early 20th centuries with nationwide totals estimated between 80,000 and 90,000, about 75% of whom are in Mexico City. The exact numbers are not known. One main source for figures is the Comité Central Israelita in Mexico City but its contact is limited to Orthodox and Conservative congregations with no contact with Jews that may be affiliated with the Reform movement or those who consider themselves secular. The Mexican government census lists religion but its categories are confusing, confusing those of some Protestant sects which practice Judaic rituals with Jewish groups. There is also controversy as to whether to count those Crypto-Jews who have converted (back) to Judaism. Sixty two percent of the population over fifteen is married, three percent divorced and four percent widowed. However, younger Jewish women are more likely to be employed outside the home (only 18% of women are housewives) and fertility rates are dropping from 3.5 children of women over 65 to 2.7 for the overall population now. There is a low level of intermarriage with the general Mexican population, with only 3.1% of marriages being mixed. Although the Jewish community is less than one percent of Mexico's total population, Mexico is one of the few countries whose Jewish population is expected to grow.

German Mexicans

German Mexicans (German: Deutschmexikaner or Deutsch-Mexikanisch, Spanish: germano-mexicano or alemán-mexicano) are Mexicans of German descent or origin.

Most ethnic Germans arrived in Mexico during the mid-to-late 19th century, spurred by government policies of Porfirio Díaz. Although a good number of them took advantage of the liberal policies then valid in Mexico and went into merchant, industrial and educational ventures, others arrived with no or limited capital, as employees or farmers. Most settled in Mexico City, Veracruz, Yucatán, and Puebla. Significant numbers of German immigrants also arrived during and after the First and Second World Wars. The Plautdietsch language is also spoken by the Mexican Mennonites, descendants of German and Dutch immigrants in the states of Chihuahua, Durango, Zacatecas and Aguascalientes. Other German towns lie in the states of Nuevo León, Jalisco, Sinaloa, Yucatán, Chiapas, Quintana Roo, and other parts of Puebla, where the German culture and language have been preserved to different extents.

The German Mexican community has largely integrated into Mexican society as a whole whilst retaining some cultural traits and in turn exerted cultural and industrial influences on Mexican society. Especially after the First World War intense processes of transculturation can be observed, particularly in Mexico City, Jalisco, Nuevo León, Puebla and, notably, with the Maya in Chiapas. These include social, cultural and identity aspects.

Arab Mexicans

An Arab Mexican is a Mexican citizen of Arabic-speaking origin who can be of various ancestral origins. The vast majority of 450,000 Mexicans who have at least partial Arab descent trace their ancestry to what is now Lebanon and Syria.

Arab immigration to Mexico started in the 19th and early 20th centuries. Roughly 100,000 Arabic-speakers settled in Mexico during this time period. They came mostly from Lebanon, Syria, Palestine, and Iraq and settled in significant numbers in Nayarit, Puebla, Mexico City and the Northern part of the country, mainly in the states of Baja California, Tamaulipas, Nuevo Leon, Sinaloa, Chihuahua, Coahuila, and Durango, as well as the city of Tampico and Guadalajara. The term "Arab Mexican" may include ethnic groups that do not in fact identify as Arab.

During the Israel-Lebanon war in 1948 and during the Six-Day War, thousands of Lebanese left Lebanon and went to Mexico. They first arrived in Veracruz. Although Arabs made up less than 5% of the total immigrant population in Mexico during the 1930s, they constituted half of the immigrant economic activity.

Immigration of Arabs in Mexico has influenced Mexican culture, in particular food, where they have introduced Kibbeh, Tabbouleh and even created recipes such as Tacos Árabes. By 1765, Dates, which originated from the Middle East, were introduced into Mexico by the Spaniards. The fusion between Arab and Mexican food has highly influenced the Yucatecan cuisine.

The majority of Arab-Mexicans are Christians who belong to the Maronite Church, Roman Catholic, Eastern Orthodox and Eastern Rite Catholic Churches. A scant number are Muslims as well as indigenous Muslims which are most common in southern states like Chiapas or Oaxaca. And Jews of Middle Eastern origins.

Romani Mexicans

The first wave of Roma arrived in Mexico in the 1890s, when they came to the Americas from Hungary, Poland and Russia and mainly settled in the United States and Brazil, but also in Mexico, Argentina, Chile, Colombia, Ecuador, Uruguay and Venezuela. There are Romani communities in the cities of Mexico City, Veracruz, Puebla, Guadalajara and Monterrey. There is also a large Romani community in San Luís Potosí.

Afro-Mexicans

Afro-Mexicans were brought to Mexico during the slave trade. Afro-Mexicans are an ethnic group that predominate in certain areas of Mexico. Such as the Costa Chica of Oaxaca and the Costa Chica of Guerrero, Veracruz (e.g. Yanga) and in some towns in northern Mexico. The existence of blacks in Mexico is difficult to assess for a number of reasons: their small numbers, heavy intermarriage with other ethnic groups and Mexico's tradition of defining itself as a "mestizaje" or mixing of European and indigenous. Mexico did have an active slave trade since the early Spanish period but from the beginning, intermarriage and mixed race offspring created an elaborate caste system. This system broke down in the very late Spanish period and after Independence the legal notion of race was eliminated. The creation of a national Mexican identity, especially after the Mexican Revolution, emphasized Mexico's indigenous and European past actively or passively eliminating its African one from popular consciousness.

The majority of Mexico's Afro-descendants are Afromestizos, i.e. "mixed-race". Individuals with significantly high amounts of African ancestry make up a very low percentage of the total Mexican population, the majority being recent black immigrants from Africa, the Caribbean and elsewhere in the Americas. According to the Intercensal survey carried out by the Mexican government, Afro-Mexicans make up 1.2% of Mexico's population, the Afro-Mexican category in the Intercensal survey includes people who self-identified solely as African and people who self-identified as partially African. The survey also states that 64.9% (896,829) of Afro-Mexicans also identified as indigenous, with 9.3% being speakers of indigenous languages.

Asian Mexicans

Asian Mexicans make up less than 1% of the total population of modern Mexico. The term "Asian" in Mexico is typically associated with the Far East rather than the Near East. As such, this group may refer to Mexicans of East and Southeast Asian descent, as well as those of South Asian origin. Mexicans of West Asian descent may sometimes be considered to be part of the group.

Asian immigration began with the forced arrival of people from the jurisdictions of the Spanish East Indies during Mexico’s viceregal period. For two and a half centuries, between 1565 and 1815, the Philippines, Guam, and Marianas islands, etc., were ruled from Mexico City for the Spanish crown. During this period, the Manila-Acapulco Galleon assisting Spain in its trade between Asia and the Americas was formed. Thousands of Filipinos were brought on these voyages to Mexico as slaves and were called "Chino", which meant Chinese. Some were also ship crew members and prisoners. In with the groups of Filipinos, there were, in reality, many diverse Asians, including Malays, Javanese, Cambodians, Timorese, and people from Bengal, India, Ceylon, Makassar, Tidore, Terenate, and China. All of these were referred to as ‘chino’. A notable example is the story of Catarina de San Juan (Mirra), an Indian girl captured by the Portuguese and sold into slavery in Manila. She arrived in New Spain and eventually she gave rise to the "China Poblana".

Later groups of Asians, predominantly Chinese, became Mexico's fastest-growing immigrant group from the 1880s to the 1920s, exploding from about 1,500 in 1895 to more than 20,000 in 1910, but also met with strong anti-Chinese sentiment, especially in Sonora and Sinaloa, which led to deportations and illegal expulsions of many of them and their descendants.

Today

Ethnic relations in modern Mexico have grown out of the historical context of the arrival of Europeans, the subsequent Spanish period of cultural and genetic miscegenation within the frame work of the castas system, the revolutionary periods focus on incorporating all ethnic and racial group into a common Mexican national identity and the indigenous revival of the late 20th century. The resulting picture has been called "a peculiar form of multi-ethnic nationalism".

Very generally speaking ethnic relations can be arranged on an axis between the two extremes of European and Amerindian cultural heritage, this is a remnant of the Spanish caste system which categorized individuals according to their perceived level of biological mixture between the two groups. Additionally the presence of considerable portions of the population with partly African and Asian heritage further complicates the situation. Even though it still arranges persons along the line between indigenous and European, in practice the classificatory system is no longer biologically based, but rather mixes socio-cultural traits with phenotypical traits, and classification is largely fluid, allowing individuals to move between categories and define their ethnic and racial identities situationally.

Official censuses
Historically, population studies and censuses have never been up to the standards that a population as diverse and numerous such as Mexico's require. The first racial census was made in 1793, being also Mexico's (then known as New Spain) first ever nationwide population census. Of it, only part of the original datasets survive. Thus most of what is known of it comes from essays made by researchers who used the census' findings as reference for their own works. More than a century would pass until the Mexican government conducted a new racial census in 1921 (some sources assert that the census of 1895 included a comprehensive racial classification, however according to the historic archives of Mexico's National Institute of Statistics that was not the case). While the 1921 census was the last time the Mexican government conducted a census that included a comprehensive racial classification, in recent time it has conducted nationwide surveys to quantify most of the ethnic groups who inhabit the country as well as the social dynamics and inequalities between them.

1793 census

Also known as the "Revillagigedo census" due to its creation being ordered by the Count of the same name, this census was Mexico's (then known as the Viceroyalty of New Spain) first ever nationwide population census. Most of its original datasets have reportedly been lost, thus most of what is now known about it comes from essays and field investigations made by academics who had access to the census data and used it as reference for their works such as Prussian geographer Alexander von Humboldt. Each author gives different estimations for each racial group in the country although they don't vary much, with Europeans ranging from 18% to 22% of New Spain's population, Mestizos ranging from 21% to 25%, Amerindians ranging from 51% to 61% and Africans being between 6,000 and 10,000, The estimations given for the total population range from 3,799,561 to 6,122,354. It is concluded then, that across nearly three centuries of colonization, the population growth trends of Europeans and Mestizos were even, while the total percentage of the Indigenous population decreased at a rate of 13%-17% per century. The authors assert that rather than Europeans and mestizos having higher birthrates, the reason for the Indigenous population's numbers decreasing lies on them suffering of higher mortality rates, due living in remote locations rather than on cities and towns founded by the Spanish colonists or being at war with them. It is also for these reasons that the number of Indigenous Mexicans presents the greater variation range between publications, as in cases their numbers in a given location were estimated rather than counted, leading to possible overestimations in some provinces and possible underestimations in others.

~Europeans are included within the Mestizo category.

Regardless of the possible imprecisions related to the counting of Indigenous peoples living outside the colonized areas, the effort that New Spain's authorities put on considering them as subjects is worth mentioning, as censuses made by other colonial or post-colonial countries did not consider Amerindians to be citizens/subjects, as example the censuses made by the Viceroyalty of the Río de la Plata would only count the inhabitants of the colonized settlements. Other example would be the censuses made by the United States, that did not include Indigenous peoples living among the general population until 1860, and indigenous peoples as a whole until 1900.

1921 census

Made right after the consummation of the Mexican revolution, the social context on which this census was made makes it particularly unique, as the government of the time was in the process of rebuilding the country and was looking forward to unite all Mexicans under a single national identity. The 1921 census' final results in regards to race, which assert that 59.3% of the Mexican population self-identified as Mestizo, 29.1% as Indigenous and only 9.8% as White were then essential to cement the "mestizaje" ideology (that asserts that the Mexican population as a whole is product of the admixture of all races) which shaped Mexican identity and culture through the 20th century and remain prominent nowadays, with extraofficial international publications such as The World Factbook and Encyclopædia Britannica using them as a reference to estimate Mexico's racial composition up to this day.

Nonetheless in recent times the census' results have been subjected to scrutiny by historians, academics and social activists alike, who assert that such drastic alterations on demographic trends with respect to the 1793 census are not possible and cite, among other statistics, the relatively low frequency of marriages between people of different continental ancestries in colonial and early independent Mexico. It is claimed that the "mestizaje" process sponsored by the state was more "cultural than biological" which resulted on the numbers of the Mestizo Mexican group being inflated at the expense of the identity of other races. Controversies aside, this census constituted the last time the Mexican Government conducted a comprehensive racial census with the breakdown by states being the following (foreigners and people who answered "other" not included):

When the 1921 census' results are compared with the results of Mexico's recent censuses as well as with modern genetic research, high consistence is found in regards to the distribution of Indigenous Mexicans across the country, with states located in south and south-eastern Mexico having both, the highest percentages of population that self-identifies as Indigenous and the highest percentages of Amerindian genetic ancestry. However this is not the case when it comes to European Mexicans, as there are instances on which states that have been shown to have a considerably high European ancestry per scientific research are reported to have very small white populations in the 1921 census, with the most extreme case being that of the state of Durango, where the aforementioned census asserts that only 0.01% of the state's population (33 persons) self-identified as "white" while modern scientific research shows that the population of Durango has similar genetic frequences to those found on European peoples (with the state's Indigenous population showing almost no foreign admixture either). Various authors theorize that the reason for these inconsistencies may lie in the Mestizo identity promoted by the Mexican government, which reportedly led to people who are not biologically Mestizos to identify as such.

Present day

The following table is a compilation of (when possible) official nationwide surveys conducted by the Mexican government who have attempted to quantify different Mexican ethnic groups. Given that for the most part each ethnic group was estimated by different surveys, with different methodologies and years apart rather than on a single comprehensive racial census, some groups could overlap with others and be overestimated or underestimated.

Of all the ethnic groups that have been surveyed Mestizos are notably absent, which is likely due to the label's fluid and subjective definition, which complicates its precise quantification. However, it can be safely assumed that Mestizos make up at least the remaining 30% unassessed percentage of Mexico's population with possibilities of increasing if the methodologies of the extant surveys are considered. As example the 2015 intercensal survey considered as Indigenous Mexicans and Afro-Mexicans altogether individuals who self-identified as "part Indigenous" or "part African" thus, said people technically would be Mestizos. Similarly, White Mexicans were quantified based on physical traits/appearance, thus technically a Mestizo with a percentage of Indigenous ancestry that was low enough to not affect his/her primarily European phenotype was considered to be white. Finally, the remaining ethnicities, for being of a rather low number or being faiths have more permissive classification criteria, therefore a Mestizo could claim to belong to one of them by practicing the faith, or by having an ancestor who belonged to said ethnicities.

Nonetheless, contemporary sociologists and historians agree that, given that the concept of "race" has a psychological foundation rather than a biological one and to society's eyes a Mestizo with a high percentage of European ancestry is considered "white" and a Mestizo with a high percentage of Indigenous ancestry is considered "Amerindian", a person that identifies with a given ethnic group should be allowed to, even if biologically he doesn't completely belong to that group.

Population genetics and phenotype

Genetic studies

Genetic studies in Mexico can be divided on three groups: studies made on self-identified Mestizos, studies made on Indigenous peoples and studies made on the general Mexican population. Studies that focus on Mexicans of predominantly European descent or Afro-Mexicans have not been made. Mexicans who self-identify as Mestizos are primarily of European and Native American ancestry. The third largest component is African, in coastal areas this is partly  a legacy of the slavery in New Spain (which saw the importation of some 100,000 to 200,000 black slaves). However, the authors of this study state that the majority of African ancestry in Mexicans is of North African origin and was brought by the Spaniards themselves as a diluted part of their genetic ancestry.

Those DNA studies on Mexicans show a significant genetic variation depending on the region analyzed, with the central region of Mexico showing a balance between indigenous and European components, and the latter gradually increasing as one travels northwards and westwards, where European ancestry becomes the majority of the genetic contribution up until cities located at the Mexico–United States border, where studies suggest there is a significant resurgence of indigenous and also African admixture. In southern Mexico there is prevalent indigenous Meso-American, but also European admixture, and a small but higher than average African genetic contributions.

According to numerous studies, on average, the largest genetic component of Mexicans who self-identify as being Mestizos is indigenous; although the difference in incidence between the indigenous and European composites is relatively small, both representing well over 40% of the genetic composition of Mestizos. The indigenous 'Amerindian' ancestry component of Mexicans, is derived from the 'Ancestral Native Americans', which formed from a sister lineage of East Asians (c. 58%), and from a sister lineage of Europeans (c. 42%), somewhere in Siberia (around 35,000 to 25,000 years ago).

In two studies of Mexicans from Mexico City and the United States, researchers noted that Mexicans had mostly European ancestry, with Native American ancestry making up 44% of the general ancestry of Mexicans. However, Native American X chromosomal ancestry exceeded 50%, and other studies found that approximately 90% of Mexicans carried a Native American maternal haplogroup. The authors suggest that this is consistent with the ethnogenesis of Latinos, through intermarriages that mostly involved European men and Native American women. 

Extant research suggests that geographic location plays a more significative role on determining the genetic makeup of the average Indigenous person than cultural traits do, an example of this is the indigenous population of Tlapa in the state of Guerrero that despite for the most part speaking Spanish and having the same cultural customs non-indigenous Mexicans have, shows an indigenous ancestry of 95%. In contrast, Nahua-speaking Indigenous peoples from the state of Veracruz have a mean European ancestry of 42% and an African ancestry of 22%.

The Mestizaje ideology, which has blurred the lines of race at an institutional level has also had a significative influence in genetic studies done in Mexico: As the criterion used in studies to determine if a Mexican is Mestizo or indigenous often lies in cultural traits such as the language spoken instead of racial self-identification or a phenotype-based selection there are studies on which populations who are considered to be Indigenous per virtue of the language spoken show a higher degree of European genetic admixture than the one populations considered to be Mestizo report in other studies. The opposite also happens, as there instances on which populations considered to be Mestizo show genetic frequencies very similar to continental European peoples in the case of Mestizos from the state of Durango or to European derived Americans in the case of Mestizos from the state of Jalisco.

A 2006 study conducted by Mexico's National Institute of Genomic Medicine (INMEGEN), which genotyped 104 samples, reported that mestizo Mexicans are 58.96% European, 35.05% "Amerindian" (Native American), and 5.03% Other. Of the six states that participated in the Study, the state of Sonora showed the highest European ancestry being approximately 70% while the State of Guerrero presented the lowest European ancestry, at around 50%.

According to a 2009 report by the Mexican Genome Project, which sampled 300 Mexicans who self-identified as Mestizos from six Mexican states and one indigenous group, the gene pool of the Mexicans population was calculated to be 55.2% percent indigenous, 41.8% European, 1.0% African, and 1.2% Asian.

A 2017 study reported highly variable ancestry in Mexican Mestizos, ranging from 70.2%-46.2% Amerindian; 25.4%-48.7% European; 5.2%-2.8% African (Martínez-Cortés et al., 2017).

A 2014 genetic study gave results of 56.0% Amerindian; 37.0% European; and 5.0% African for Mexican Mestizos. The authors reported similar findings of geographical variation, as in other studies. Native American ancestry is lower in northerly regions of Mexico, and higher in the south. African ancestry is generally quite low across most of Mexico, with the exception of a small number of coastal communities.

An autosomal study performed in Mestizos from Mexico's three largest cities reported that Mestizos from Mexico city had an average ancestry of 50% European, 1% African and 49% Amerindian whereas Mestizos from the cities of Monterrey and Guadalajara had both a European ancestry of 60% and an indigenous ancestry of 40% in average.

An autosomal study performed in Mexicans from the states of Nuevo Leon, Zacatecas and San Luis Potosí found the average indigenous ancestry to be 22% while 78% of the genetic ancestry was of Spanish/European origin.

An autosomal study performed in Mexico City reported that Mexican mestizos' mean ancestry was 57% European, 40% Amerindian and 3% African.

Additional studies suggests a tendency relating a higher European admixture with a higher socioeconomic status and a higher Amerindian ancestry with a lower socioeconomic status: a study made exclusively on low income Mestizos residing in Mexico City found the mean admixture to be 0.590, 0.348, and 0.062 for Amerindian, European and African respectively whereas the European admixture increased to an average of around 70% on mestizos belonging to a higher socioeconomical level.

An autosomal genetic study which included the states of Mexico, Morelos, Puebla, Queretaro and Mexico City determined the average ancestry of the central region of Mexico to be 52% European 39% Amerindian, and 9% African.

An autosomal genetic study performed in the town of Metztitlan in the state of Hidalgo reported that the average genetic ancestry of the town's autochthonous (indigenous) population was 64% Amerindian, 25% European and 11% African.

A 2012 study published by the Journal of Human Genetics Y chromosomes found the deep paternal ancestry of the Mexican mestizo population to be predominately European (64.9%), followed by Amerindian (30.8%) and Asian(1.2%). The European Y chromosome was more prevalent in the north and west (66.7-95%) and Native American ancestry increased in the center and southeast (37-50%), the African ancestry was low and relatively homogeneous (0-8.8%). The states that participated in this study where Aguascalientes, Chiapas, Chihuahua, Durango, Guerrero, Jalisco, Oaxaca, Sinaloa, Veracruz and Yucatán. The largest amount of chromosomes found were identified as belonging to the haplogroups from Western Europe, East Europe and Eurasia, Siberia and the Americas and Northern Europe with relatively smaller traces of haplogroups from Central Asia, South-east Asia, South-central Asia, Western Asia, The Caucasus, North Africa, Near East, East Asia, North-east Asia, South-west Asia and the Middle East.

In one region, as well as African admixture, some may have small traces of Asian admixture due to the thousands of Filipinos slaves called Chinos (Asian slaves of diverse origins, not just Filipino and Chinese) that arrived on the Nao de China. More recent Asian immigration (specifically Chinese) may help explain the comparatively high Asian contribution in Northwest Mexico (i.e., Sonora).

Etiological studies 

Etiological studies are genetic studies on which volunteers suffer of a specific health condition/disease, as diseases tend to manifest on higher frequencies on people with a determinated genetic ancestry, the results of said studies are not accurate to represent the genetics of the population said volunteers belong to as a whole
 56.0% Amerindian; 38% European; 6% African for northeast de México (Martínez-Fierro et al., 2009).
 61.0% Amerindian; 37.0% European; 2.0% African for Ciudad de México (Kosoy et al., 2009).
 65.0% Amerindian; 30.0% European; 5.0% African for Ciudad de México.

Phenotypical research
	

Albeit not as numerous or with a history as long as genetic research in the country, studies regarding the presence of different phenotypical traits (hair color, hair shape, eye color etc.) in Mexicans have been made. Those studies have recently gained the attention of Mexico's government which has begun conducting its own nationwide investigations, with the aim of document dynamics and inequalities on interactions between Mexicans of different ethnicities/races as well as to have a more concise idea of the ethnic composition of the country (a field that has been long neglected at an institutional level in Mexico). The results of these studies effectively refute misconceptions regarding Mexico's population, showing that Mexico is an exceptionally diverse country, where any color or type of trait can be found with ease in any region.

Some studies, such as the one published by the American Sociological Association refute misconceptions that are very prevalent even among Mexicans themselves, as it found the differences in the frequencies of phenotypical traits such as blond hair between the population of the Northern regions of Mexico (where this trait has a frequency of 22.3% - 23.9%) and the population of the Central regions of Mexico (with a frequency of 18.9% to 21.3%) are not as pronounced as are commonly thought to be. Per the methodology of the study, the presence of blond hair was required for a Mexican to be classified as white as "unlike skin color, blond hair does not darken with sun exposure" With a similar methodology, other study, made by the Metropolitan Autonomous University of Mexico calculated the frequency of blond hair at 23%, Mexicans with red red-hair were classified as "other".

A 2014 study made by the University College London analyzed the frequencies of several different phenotypical traits on populations of five different Latin American countries (Brazil, Chile, Colombia, Mexico and Peru). In the case of Mexico the National Institute of Anthropology and History collaborated in the investigation with the results being the following:

The majority of the samples (approx. 90%) hailed from Mexico City and Southern Mexican states, meaning that Northern and Western regions of Mexico were underrepresented as around 45% of Mexico's population lives there.

Nationwide surveys sponsored by the Mexican government that quantify the percentage of the different skin tones present on Mexico's population have been made, the first in 2010 by the CONAPRED (Mexico's National Bureau for Prevention of Discrimination) and the second in 2017 by the INEGI (Mexico's National Institute of Statistics) Each study used a different color palette, in the case of CONAPRED's study it was a palette with 9 color choices developed by the institute itself whereas in the case of the INEGI study the palette used was the palette for the PERLA (Latin American Race and Ethnicity Project) with 11 color categories.

As the progression from the darker tones to the lightest ones is not as uniform in the palette used by the INEGI (some tones are practically the same while there are marked differences between others) as it is in the CONAPRED's palette, two color categories ended up containing nearly 70% of surveyed Mexicans whereas there were color categories that had less than 1% of Mexicans each. Even though Mexico's government has downplayed the racial connotations of said studies by opting for using the term "light-skinned Mexican" to refer to the segment of Mexico's population who possess European physical traits/appearance and "dark-skinned Mexican" to refer the segment of Mexico's population who does not, the publication of said studies hasn't been free of controversy, specially in the case of the study published in 2017 as besides skin color it also accounted for different socioeconomic factors such as educational achievements and occupational profiles, with media outlets bringing to Mexico's mainstream opinion circles concepts such as systemic racism, white privilege, and colonialism. Nonetheless it is agreed that to acknowledge that Mexico is a diverse country constitutes a steep in the right direction to fight social inequalities.

In 2018, the new edition of the ENADIS was published, this time being a joint effort by the CONAPRED and the INEGI with collaboration of the UNAM, the CONACyT and the CNDH. Like its 2010 antecessor, it surveyed Mexican citizens about topics related to discrimination and collected data related to phenotype and ethnic self-identification. It concluded that Mexico is still a fairly conservative country regarding minority groups such as religious minorities, ethnic minorities, foreigners, members of the LGBT collective etc. albeit there's pronounced regional differences, with states in the south-center regions of Mexico having in general notoriously higher discrimination rates towards the aforementioned social groups than the ones states in the western-north regions have. For the collecting of data related to skin color the palette used was again the PERLA one. This time 11% of Mexicans were reported to have "dark skin tones (A-E)" 59% to have "medium skin tones (F-G)" and 29% to have "light skin tones (H-K)". The reason for the huge difference regarding the reported percentages of Mexicans with light skin (around 18% lower) and medium skin (around 16% higher) in the relation to previous nationwide surveys lies in the fact that the ENADIS 2017 prioritized the surveying of Mexicans from "vulnerable groups" which among other measures meant that states with known high numbers of people from said groups surveyed more people.

The following tables (the first from a study published in 2002 and the second from a study published in 2018) show the frequencies of different blood types in various Mexican cities and states, as Mexico's Amerindian/Indigenous population exclusively exhibits the "O" blood type, the presence of other blood groups can give an approximate idea of the amount of foreign influence there is in each state that has been analyzed. The results of this studies however, shouldn't be taken as exact, literal estimations for the percentages of different ethnic groups that there may be in Mexico (I.E. A+B blood groups = percentage of White Mexicans) for reasons such as the fact that a Mestizo Mexican can have "A", "B" etc. blood types or the fact that the "O" blood type does exist in Europe, with it having a frequency of 44% in Spain for example.

Both studies find similar trends regarding the distribution of different blood groups, with foreign blood groups being more common in the North and Western regions of Mexico, which is congruent with the findings of genetic studies that have been made in the country through the years. It is also observed that "A" and "B" blood groups are more common among younger volunteers whereas "AB" and "O" are more common in older ones. The total number of analyzed samples in the 2018 study was 271,164.

A study performed in hospitals of Mexico City reported that in average 51.8% of Mexican newborns presented the congenital skin birthmark known as the Mongolian spot whilst it was absent in 48.2% of the analyzed babies. The Mongolian spot appears with a very high frequency (85-95%) in Asian, Native American and African children. The skin lesion reportedly almost always appears on South American and Mexican children who are racially Mestizos while having a very low frequency (5-10%) in Caucasian children. According to the Mexican Social Security Institute (IMSS) nationwide, around half of Mexican babies have the Mongolian spot.

Languages

Mexicans are linguistically diverse, with many speaking European languages as well as various Indigenous Mexican Languages. Spanish is spoken by approximately 92.17% of Mexicans as their first language making them the largest Spanish speaking group in the world followed by Colombia (45,273,925), Spain (41,063,259) and Argentina (40,134,425). Although the great majority speak Spanish de facto the second most populous language among Mexicans is English due to the regional proximity of the United States which calls for a bilingual relationship in order to conduct business and trade as well as the migration of Mexicans into that country who adopt it as a second language.

Mexican Spanish is distinct in dialect, tone and syntax to the Peninsular Spanish spoken in Spain. It contains a large amount of loan words from indigenous languages, mostly from the Nahuatl language such as: "chocolate", "tomate", "mezquite", "chile", and "coyote".

Mexico has no official de jure language, but as of 2003 it recognizes 68 indigenous Amerindian languages as "national languages" along with Spanish which are protected under Mexican National law giving indigenous peoples the entitlement to request public services and documents in their native languages. The law also includes other Amerindian languages regardless of origin, that is, it includes the Amerindian languages of other ethnic groups that are non-native to the Mexican national territory. As such, Mexico's National Commission for the Development of Indigenous Peoples recognizes the language of the Kickapoo who immigrated from the United States, and recognizes the languages of Guatemalan Amerindian refugees. The most numerous indigenous language spoken by Mexicans is Nahuatl which is spoken by 1.7% of the population in Mexico over the age of 5. Approximately 6,044,547 Mexicans (5.4%) speak an indigenous language according to the 2000 Census in Mexico. There are also Mexicans living abroad which speak indigenous languages mostly in the United States but their number is unknown.

English is also spoken. Other European languages spoken in Mexico are Plautdietsch, French, German, Romani and Venetian.

Culture

Mexican culture reflects the complexity of the country's history through the blending of indigenous cultures and the culture of Spain, imparted during Spain's 300-year colonization of Mexico. Exogenous cultural elements mainly from the United States have been incorporated into Mexican culture.

The Porfirian era (el Porfiriato), in the last quarter of the 19th century and the first decade of the 20th century, was marked by economic progress and peace. After four decades of civil unrest and war, Mexico saw the development of philosophy and the arts, promoted by President Díaz himself. Since that time, as accentuated during the Mexican Revolution, cultural identity has had its foundation in the mestizaje, of which the indigenous (i.e. Amerindian) element is the core. In light of the various ethnicities that formed the Mexican people, José Vasconcelos in his publication La Raza Cósmica (The Cosmic Race) (1925) defined Mexico to be the melting pot of all races (thus extending the definition of the mestizo) not only biologically but culturally as well. This exalting of mestizaje was a revolutionary idea that sharply contrasted with the idea of a superior pure race prevalent in Europe at the time.

Literature

The literature of Mexico has its antecedents in the literatures of the indigenous settlements of Mesoamerica. The most well known prehispanic poet is Nezahualcoyotl. Modern Mexican literature was influenced by the concepts of the Spanish colonialization of Mesoamerica. Outstanding writers and poets from the Spanish period include Juan Ruiz de Alarcón and Juana Inés de la Cruz.

In light of the various ethnicities that formed the Mexican people, José Vasconcelos in his publication La Raza Cósmica (The Cosmic Race) (1925) defined Mexico to be the melting pot of all races, biologically as well as culturally.

Other writers include Alfonso Reyes, José Joaquín Fernández de Lizardi, Ignacio Manuel Altamirano, Carlos Fuentes, Octavio Paz (Nobel Laureate), Renato Leduc, Carlos Monsiváis, Elena Poniatowska, Mariano Azuela ("Los de abajo") and Juan Rulfo ("Pedro Páramo"). Bruno Traven wrote "Canasta de cuentos mexicanos", "El tesoro de la Sierra Madre."

Science

The National Autonomous University of Mexico was officially established in 1910, and the university become one of the most important institutes of higher learning in Mexico. UNAM provides world class education in science, medicine, and engineering. Many scientific institutes and new institutes of higher learning, such as National Polytechnic Institute (founded in 1936), were established during the first half of the 20th century. Most of the new research institutes were created within UNAM. Twelve institutes were integrated into UNAM from 1929 to 1973. In 1959, the Mexican Academy of Sciences was created to coordinate scientific efforts between academics.

In 1995 the Mexican chemist Mario J. Molina shared the Nobel Prize in Chemistry with Paul J. Crutzen and F. Sherwood Rowland for their work in atmospheric chemistry, particularly concerning the formation and decomposition of ozone. Molina, an alumnus of UNAM, became the first Mexican citizen to win the Nobel Prize in science.

In recent years, the largest scientific project being developed in Mexico was the construction of the Large Millimeter Telescope (Gran Telescopio Milimétrico, GMT), the world's largest and most sensitive single-aperture telescope in its frequency range. It was designed to observe regions of space obscured by stellar dust.

Music

Mexican society enjoys a vast array of music genres, showing the diversity of Mexican culture. Traditional music includes Mariachi, Banda, Norteño, Ranchera and Corridos; on an everyday basis most Mexicans listen to contemporary music such as pop, rock, etc. in both English and Spanish. Mexico has the largest media industry in Hispanic America, producing Mexican artists who are famous in Central and South America and parts of Europe, especially Spain.

Some well-known Mexican singers are Thalía, Luis Miguel, Alejandro Fernández, Julieta Venegas and Paulina Rubio. Mexican singers of traditional music are Lila Downs, Susana Harp, Jaramar, GEO Meneses and Alejandra Robles. Popular groups are Café Tacuba, Molotov and Maná, among others. Since the early years of the 2000s (decade), Mexican rock has seen widespread growth both domestically and internationally.

Cinema

Mexican films from the Golden Age in the 1940s and 1950s are the greatest examples of Hispanic American cinema, with a huge industry comparable to the Hollywood of those years. Mexican films were exported and exhibited in all of Hispanic America and Europe. María Candelaria (1944) by Emilio Fernández, was one of the first films awarded a Palme d'Or at the Cannes Film Festival in 1946, the first time the event was held after World War II. The famous Spanish-born director Luis Buñuel realized in Mexico, between 1947 and 1965 some of his master pieces like Los Olvidados (1949), Viridiana (1961) and El angel exterminador (1963). Famous actors and actresses from this period include María Félix, Pedro Infante, Dolores del Río, Jorge Negrete and the comedian Cantinflas.

More recently, films such as Como agua para chocolate (1992), Cronos (1993), Y tu mamá también (2001), and Pan's Labyrinth (2006) have been successful in creating universal stories about contemporary subjects, and were internationally recognised, as in the prestigious Cannes Film Festival. Mexican directors Alejandro González Iñárritu (Amores perros, Babel, Birdman), Alfonso Cuarón (Children of Men, Harry Potter and the Prisoner of Azkaban, Gravity, Roma), Guillermo del Toro (Pacific Rim, Crimson Peak, The Shape of Water), Carlos Carrera (The Crime of Father Amaro), and screenwriter Guillermo Arriaga are some of the most known present-day film makers.

Visual arts

Post-revolutionary art in Mexico had its expression in the works of renowned artists such as Frida Kahlo, Diego Rivera, José Clemente Orozco, Rufino Tamayo, Federico Cantú Garza, David Alfaro Siqueiros and Juan O'Gorman. Diego Rivera, the most well-known figure of Mexican muralism, painted the Man at the Crossroads at the Rockefeller Center in New York City, a huge mural that was destroyed the next year because of the inclusion of a portrait of Russian communist leader Lenin. Some of Rivera's murals are displayed at the Mexican National Palace and the Palace of Fine Arts.

Architecture

For the artistic relevance of many of Mexico's architectural structures, including entire sections of prehispanic and colonial cities, have been designated World Heritage. The country has the first place in number of sites declared World Heritage Site by UNESCO in the Americas.

Cuisine

Mexican cuisine is influenced by Spanish and indigenous cultures. Mole is the national dish of Mexico. Chocolate and vanilla were discovered by the Aztecs of Mexico. The indigenous peoples of Mexico introduced vanilla, corn, chocolate, sweet potatoes, tomatoes, papayas, chilies, avocados, and pineapples.

Holidays
Day of the Dead is an important Mexican holiday observed by Mexicans. The holiday is influenced by Mesoamerican ritual, European religion and Spanish culture. The holiday traces its roots to the Aztecs and the tradition was first practiced thousands of years ago by indigenous peoples such as the Aztecs and the Toltecs.

Religion

Mexico has no official religion, but most Mexicans declare themselves Roman Catholic. Mexico is often seen as a very observant Catholic society. Most Mexicans tend to have opinions that are more in line with Catholic social teaching. Mexico has been resistant to Protestant incursion partly because Protestantism in Mexico has long been associated with the United States, which leads to the reinforcement of Catholicism as part of the Mexican identity.

The Constitution of 1917 imposed limitations on the church and sometimes codified state intrusion into church matters. The government does not provide financial contributions to the church, nor does the church participate in public education. However, Christmas is a national holiday and every year during Easter and Christmas all schools in Mexico, public and private, send their students on vacation.

In 1992, Mexico lifted almost all restrictions on the religions, including granting all religious groups legal status, conceding them limited property, and lifting restrictions on the number of priests in the country. Until recently, priests did not have the right to vote, and even now they cannot be elected to public office.

The Catholic Church is the dominant religion in Mexico, with about 80% of the population as of 2017, which is the world's second largest number of Catholics, surpassed only by Brazil. Movements of return and revival of the indigenous Mesoamerican religions (Mexicayotl, Toltecayotl) have also appeared in recent decades.

Diaspora

There is a large Mexican diaspora in the United States. They are concentrated in California and Texas. The Greater Los Angeles area is home to a large Mexican immigrant population. There is also a sizeable Mexican population in Canada is home to the next largest population of Mexican in Canada, Spain, Guatemala, and Germany.

See also

List of Mexicans
List of Mexican actors
List of Mexican Americans
Immigration to Mexico
Emigration from Mexico
Chicano
Pocho
Mexican cuisine
Mexican nobility
Mexican Filipinos
Languages of Mexico
National symbols of Mexico
Mexican culture
Mexican Americans
Mexican immigration to Spain
California Mexicans
Tejano Mexicans
Hispanics

References

Works cited
 Friedlander, Judith. 1975. Being Indian in Hueyapan: A Study of Forced Identity in Contemporary Mexico. New York: Saint Martin's Press.
 Gómez M., et al. Historia de México: Texto de Consulta Para Educación Media Superior. Mexico: Limusa, 2006.
 Moot Rodriguez, Modern History of Mexico, Universidad de Chan, Mexico, 2002.

Bibliography

Further reading
 Oster, Patrick, The Mexicans: a personal portrait of a people, New York : HarperCollins, 2002. .

Ethnic groups in Mexico
North American people